Arene flexispina is a species of sea snail, a marine gastropod mollusk in the family Areneidae.

Description

The shell can grow up to be 7 mm in length.

Distribution
Arene flexispina can be found off of East Brazil.

References

External links
 To Biodiversity Heritage Library (1 publication)
 To Encyclopedia of Life
 To USNM Invertebrate Zoology Mollusca Collection
 To World Register of Marine Species

Areneidae
Gastropods described in 1985